Nguyễn Hoàng Quốc Chí (born 4 December 1991) is a Vietnamese footballer who plays as a midfielder for V-League (Vietnam) club Hải Phòng. Quốc Chí was born in a football family but spent most of his early life in school, only in the last year of high school did he change his mind and decide to pursue football as a career.

References 

1991 births
Living people
Vietnamese footballers
Association football midfielders
Khanh Hoa FC players
Quang Nam FC players
V.League 1 players